The Albany Great Danes men's lacrosse team represents the University at Albany in NCAA Division I men's college lacrosse. Albany currently competes in the America East Conference and plays its home games on Bob Ford Field at Tom & Mary Casey Stadium. The team has reached the NCAA Men's Lacrosse Championship tournament ten times. The Great Danes are currently coached by Scott Marr.

History
The program began in 1970 with a 3–7 record competing in Division III. In 1975, the program would reach the ECAC Division III Tournament under coach Dave Armstrong. From 1975 to 1997, the Great Danes would reach two more ECAC Division III Tournaments. In 1997 the Great Danes would reach the finals of the ECAC Division II Tournament.

2000–2006
In 2000, the Great Danes began play in the America East at the Division I level. In 2001, Scott Marr was given the reins of the program. Even though the Great Danes finished with a 3–8 record in 2001, they compiled an 8–6 regular season to take the regular season conference championship in the America East in 2002. They would reach the championship game but lose to the Stony Brook Seawolves 8–6.

Led by a new crop of recruits, some of the first lacrosse players in school history to be on scholarship, such as Kevin Rae and Luke Daquino, the Great Danes would start making a mark on college lacrosse in 2003. The Great Danes would go 8–6 and seek revenge against Stony Brook in the America East semi-finals 11–5 to move on to face the University of Hartford for the America East Championship. On May 3, 2003, Albany would defeat Hartford 7–5 to win their first ever America East Championship. They would go on to face and lose to Princeton University in the first round on the NCAA Tournament.

The success for the Great Danes would not stop after 2003. With incoming recruits and a strong core of returning players, the Great Danes would continue their championship ways. In 2004, including an upset against the University of Massachusetts Amherst, the Great Danes would go on to win another America East Championship. They would play Syracuse University in the first round and lose 21–13.

The surge would continue into 2005 as the Great Danes defeated Stony Brook 16–7 to win their third straight America East Championship. However, the first round NCAA Tournament jinx would continue as the Great Danes were demolished by the University of Virginia 23–9.

2006 would be an off year for the Great Danes. With all-time career points leader at the time Luke Daquino and career saves leader Kevin Rae graduated, the team was young and over matched. The Great Danes would sneak into the America East Tournament, but lose 19–10 to UMBC. However, it would be soon that the Great Danes would go back to their winning ways.

Despite a season of struggles in 2006, the program took one major stride during the season. In the fall of 2005, John Fallon Field was completed and became the new home of the Great Danes. An all-weather facility, Albany finally had a place to call home. In previous seasons the team would play home games at University Field. However, due to harsh winters and wet springs, the field was usually not in playing condition come lacrosse season. This forced many home games to be played at local high schools and community colleges. With John Fallon Field, Albany now had one of the premier outdoor lacrosse fields in the Northeast.

2007 season
In the 2007 season, the lacrosse team would be ranked in the top-25 in both USILA and Nike/Inside Lacrosse polls and reached a high of #2 in the USILA poll. Notable wins were against #1 ranked Johns Hopkins Blue Jays and #10 Delaware. On May 13, 2007, the men's lacrosse team became the first team at the Division I level to advance/win a match in the NCAA Tournament, defeating Loyola College in Maryland 19–10 in front of nearly 3,000 people at John Fallon Field. One week later, the Great Danes were defeated by undefeated Cornell University 12–11 in the NCAA Quarterfinals at Princeton University.

The team finished ranked #4 in the Nike/Inside Lacrosse poll, the highest ranking for any team in school history. Head Coach Scott Marr was awarded the USILA Division I National Lacrosse Coach of the Year to cap the amazing season.

One of the big stars for the lacrosse team in 2007 was senior attackman Frank Resetarits. He would become the first Great Dane in school history to earn first-team All-American honors as he was selected to the 2007 USILA All-America Team. Resetarits was also named a finalist for the Tewaaraton Trophy. Resetarits would also become the first lacrosse player in school history to be drafted into the Major League Lacrosse, selected by the Washington Bayhawks, but being traded and making his debut with the Long Island Lizards. Resetarits would also join the National Lacrosse League, drafted #5 overall by the San Jose Stealth in 2007 NLL Draft.

Resetarits was joined in the pros by UAlbany elite goal scorer Merrick Thomson. Thomson would sign a free agent contract with the New Jersey Pride on the MLL, and then drafted #2 overall by the Philadelphia Wings in the 2007 NLL Draft. Thomson and Restarts were respectively ranked one and two in career points at Albany following the season.  Defender Liam Gleason was also signed by the New Jersey Pride shortly after the 2007 Major League Lacrosse draft.

Two other pieces of the championship team were drafted in the 2008 Major League Lacrosse draft. Midfielder Jordan Levine was selected 10th Overall by the New Jersey Pride, reuniting him with Thomson and Gleason. Star goaltender Brett Queener was selected 48th Overall by the Rochester Rattlers making him the 5th UAlbany graduate to play professionally in Major League Lacrosse.

2013 season

The 2013 season opened with high expectations. Many in the media felt the team had the ability to go far in the NCAA Tournament. Those predictions grew further in the season opener at Syracuse. The Great Danes had never beaten The Orange, who were ranked #13 in the nation. However, UAlbany would knock them in double-overtime 16–15. It would be the first season opening loss for Syracuse since 1996. Anthony "Antdog" Ostrander played a key role in the win, shutting down JoJo Marasco, arguably Syracuse's best player, in double overtime to solidify the victory.

After going 5–3 in their next eight games, the Great Danes would travel to Johns Hopkins. With the games being shown on national television (ESPNU), the Great Danes once again pulled off an upset. UAlbany, ranked #20 at the time, would defeat the #10 ranked Blue Jays 10–9. Freshman goalie Blaze Riorden had his best game of his short career, recording 20 saves.

The Great Danes would finish 4–1 to finish the season, 11–4 overall. UAlbany would go 5–0 in regular season America East play for the second time in program history. Amazingly, the Great Danes would go 9–2 on the road while only 3–2 at home. On May 4, after a five years without a title, the Great Danes would defeat UMBC 19–10 to win the America East Championship. However, the Great Danes would fall to Denver in the first round of the NCAA Tournament. Head Coach Scott Marr would record his 100th career win at UAlbany during the season.

Thompson Trio
Much of the Great Danes success in 2013 was centered around one family. Miles Thompson, Ty Thompson and Lyle Thompson (also known as the Thompson Trio), were a vital part of the Great Danes offense. Miles and Lyle are brothers, while Ty is their cousin (another brother, Jeremy Thompson played for Syracuse until 2011). All three were star recruits coming to UAlbany. The three were born in the Onondaga Nation, a nine-square-mile independent political entity recognized by the United States. Each of the Thompsons wore a traditional native hair style, with long braids that became their trademark on the field. The three also became known for their skills on the field, which involved trick passes and stick handling, behind the back shots, one handed shots and their quick agility.

In 2013, Ty Thompson would score 51 goals, Miles would score 42 and Lyle 46 goals going into the NCAA Tournament. The fourth leading scorers for the Great Danes, Will Fuller and John Maloney, had only 18 goals. Lyle Thompson would be the key factor for the Great Danes. The sophomore was vital in leading the No. 1 offense in the nation with 108 points through 17 games. Lyle became the eighth men's lacrosse player in NCAA history to record 100 points in a season. He finished seven points behind all-time NCAA record holder Steve Marahol's (UMBC) 114 points (37g, 77a) set in 1992. He would win the America East Player of the Year Award and became the second Great Dane to be named a Tewaaraton Award finalist, and the first Native American to be named a Tewaaraton Award finalist.

In 2014, the Thompsons would continue their unbelievable play. Despite a shaky 9–5 regular season, the Great Danes would be the #1 overall seed in the America East Tournament. Lyle would become only the third player in conference history to win back-to-back Player of the Year Awards.  Earning at least four points in all 14 games played, the junior attack has earned a Division I-best 61 assists and 37 goals in the regular season. In the American East Tournament, Lyle became the first Division I player ever to earn two 100-point seasons. On May 3, 2014, the Great Danes would win their second straight America East Championship, defeating UMBC 20–11.

On May 10, 2014, the Great Danes would take on Loyola in the first round of the NCAA Tournament. Loyola was the number one ranked team in the nation going into the game. The Great Danes, with strong defensive play, defeated the Greyhounds 13–6 for the second NCAA Tournament victory in school history. In the game Lyle would become the DI single season record holder in points, beating out Marahol's record he just missed in the previous season. In the game Miles would also pass Marahol's numbers to become second on that list after scoring five goals and two assists. The Great Danes would end up losing 14–13 in overtime to Notre Dame in the Quarterfinals the following week.

As a junior Lyle would compile the top single season point total in DI history, earning 128 points as well as tying the DI single season assists record with 77, adding 51 goals.  He became the first player in DI history to have a pair of 100+ point seasons after finishing with 113 last year.  In UAlbany's 18 games in 2014 he scored at least four points, including 11 seven+ point contests. He was named Division I Outstanding Player of the Year and the DI Outstanding Attackman by the United States Intercollegiate Lacrosse Association (USILA) in 2014.

On May 29, 2014, both Miles and Lyle Thompson were named the co-winners of the 2014 Tewaaraton Trophy. It was the first time ever that two players shared, and a Native American was awarded, the trophy. Two days later, Miles and Ty were officially put on the active roster of the MLL Rochester Rattlers. It was also announced that Miles would return to the program in 2015 as a Graduate Assistant.

The success of the Thompson Trio on the field led to a national press following in late 2014. CNN, CBS and ABC all did nightly news pieces on the three. The NY Times also did a story on them, which was posted on the front page of the newspaper. In all the pieces the three talked about their heritage, the acceptance of their heritage at UAlbany, supporting the Onondaga Nation and promoting the game of lacrosse.

One of the Greats
In 2015, Lyle Thompson cemented himself as one of the greatest collegiate lacrosse players in NCAA history. He was named the recipient of the 2015 Tewaaraton Trophy for the top player in men's lacrosse and was the first ever male lacrosse player to earn the award in two consecutive seasons. In 2015, Thompson led the NCAA in points per game for the third-straight year with 6.37 a contest and assists per game at 3.63 a contest. He finished with an NCAA Division I best 121 points, the second-highest single season tally in DI history, and 69 assists, adding 52 goals. He would lead UAlbany to a third-consecutive America East regular season and tournament title. The Great Danes would take on Cornell in the first round of the NCAA Tournament, winning 19–10. In a rematch of the 2014 quarterfinals, UAlbany would fall to Notre Dame 14–10. Thompson finished his career as the all-time Division I points and assists leader, concluding with 400 points off 175 goals and 225 assists from 2012 to 2015 with UAlbany. In his career he played in 70 games, scoring in 68 of them and earned multiple points in each of his last 44 games, including all contests in 2014 and 2015.

#1 Ranking and the Final Four
2018 started with much anticipated hype, as the Great Danes looked like they would have one of the best offenses in the nation, led by Senior Connor Fields and incoming freshman Tehoka Nanticoke, one of the most highly ranked high school players in the nation. The Great Danes would open up the season ranked #3 in the nation. UAlbany did not disappoint, crushing Syracuse 15–3 in their first game. One week later, after an 18–5 win over the Drexel, the Great Danes would be ranked as the #1 team in the nation by the United States Intercollegiate Lacrosse Association (USILA) coaches poll and the Inside Lacrosse Maverik media poll. It would be the first time that any UAlbany Division I team, and any DI program affiliated with the State of New York (SUNY) system, had been ranked #1 in its history. The Great Danes would win eight consecutive games as the #1 ranked team in the nation, including an amazing 4th quarter comeback against #2 ranked Maryland 11–10 on March 10 of 2018. The streak and #1 ranking would last until April 6, when UAlbany was upset by UMBC 11–7.

Most of the mid-season success for UAlbany came without their key weapons on the field. Connor Fields suffered a knee injury in a March 24 victory over UMAss-Lowell. He would re-injure the knee in the second to last game of the season in a 14–6 loss to Yale. However, new stars would rise to lead the Great Danes to success. Sophomore Faceoff Specialists TD Ierlan became a star, becoming one of the elite face-off men in the country. Sophomore Jakob Patterson and Senior Kyle McClancy stepped up on offense, while goalie JD Colarusso was a force in net.

The Great Danes would run through the America East Tournament as the #1 seed and host to take home the title on May 5 in a 14–4 win over Vermont. UAlbany would be given the #2 overall seed in the 2018 NCAA Lacrosse Tournament and would host the Southern Conference champion Richmond Spiders in the 1st Round of the tournament. Despite a close game early on, UAlbany would win 18–9 to advance to the NCAA Quarterfinals to face the Denver Pioneers at Hofstra.

The May 19th match-up put two elite programs head to head. However, much hype was focused on the battle of the top two faceoff-men in the country, UAlbany's TD Ierlan and Denver's Trevor Baptiste. In this game, each player would go 15-of-30. Ierlan had the final faceoff victory and ground ball with 38 seconds left as UAlbany ran out the clock for the win. During the game Ierlan would win his 341st faceoff victories of the season, setting a new NCAA single season record. The former record holder was Brendan Fowler, who had 339 faceoff wins for Duke in 2013. The game was tight to the end, with the Great Danes holding a four-goal lead with under five minutes to play. Despite a furious comeback, UAlbany held on 15–13 to advance to the Final Four for the first time in school history after going 0–4 in their previous trips to the Quarterfinals. It would be the first time a SUNY school earned a trip to a Men's Division I Final Four. UAlbany also matched its single season wins record with its 16th victory today. UAlbany was 16–3 in 2015. Also, UAlbany's senior class earned its 59th victory, becoming the winningest class in program history. The class was 59–11 overall in its four years.

Coaches

Current coaching staff
 Head coach – Scott Marr (Johns Hopkins, 1991)
 Associate Head Coach – Merrick Thomson (UAlbany, 2007)
 Assistant coach – John Maloney (UAlbany, 2016)

All-time head coaches

Season results
The following is a list of Albany's season results since the institution of NCAA Division I in 1971 (Albany competed as a Division III program from 1970 to 1995 and as a Division II program from 1996 to 1999):

{| class="wikitable"

|- align="center"

†NCAA canceled 2020 collegiate activities due to the COVID-19 virus.

References

External links
 
 

 
1970 establishments in New York (state)
Lacrosse clubs established in 1970